Gypsy is an English name for the Romani people.

Gypsy or gypsies or The Gypsies may also refer to:

Computing and technology
 Gypsy (database), a database of Mobile Genetic Elements
 Gypsy (software), a word processing program

Films
 Gypsies (1922 film), a Czech silent drama by Karl Anton
 Gypsy (1937 film), a drama film by Roy William Neill
 Gypsy (1962 film), a film adaptation of the stage musical Gypsy
 The Gypsy (film), a 1975 French-Italian crime-drama film by José Giovanni 
 Gypsy (1993 film), a musical starring Bette Midler
 Gypsy (2011 film), a Slovakian drama
 Gypsy (2020 film), an Indian romantic road movie
 The Gypsy, a 1911 film with Florence Lawrence
 Gypsy, a character in A Bug's Life

Literature
 Gypsy (1929 play), by Maxwell Anderson
 The Gypsy (short story), by Agatha Christie
 The Gypsy (novel), a 1992 novel by Steven Brust and Megan Lindholm
 Gypsy: A Memoir, a book by Gypsy Rose Lee
 The Gypsies (poem), by Alexander Pushkin
 Gypsy (comics), character in DC Comics
 Cyganie (Gypsies), a play by Józef Korzeniowski
 Gypsies, a 1975 book by Josef Koudelka
 Gypsy, a 1985 romance novel by Carole Mortimer
 Gypsy, a 2008 book by Lesley Pearse
 Gypsies, a novel by Robert Charles Wilson

Music

Artists
 Gypsy (band), an American progressive rock band
 The Gypsies (Danish band), a hip hop/R&B group
 The Gypsies (Sri Lankan band)

Albums and EPs
 Gypsy (Gypsy album), a 1970 album by Gypsy
 Gypsies (album), a 1978 album Lalo Schifrin
 Gypsy (soundtrack), a soundtrack album for the 1993 film

Songs 
 "The Gypsy" (song), a 1945 song by Billy Reid, recorded by several different artists
 "Gypsy" (Fleetwood Mac song) (1982)
 "Gypsy" (Lady Gaga song) (2013)
 "Gypsy (Of a Strange and Distant Time)", a 1969 song by the Moody Blues
 "Gypsy" (Shakira song) (2010)
 "Gypsy" (Uriah Heep song) (1970)
 "Gypsy", a song by Black Sabbath from Technical Ecstasy
 "Gypsy", a song by Brotherhood of Man from Higher Than High
 "The Gypsy", a song by Deep Purple from Stormbringer
 "Gypsy", a song by Dio from Holy Diver
 "Gypsy", a song by Ektomorf from Destroy
 "Gypsy", a song by Emperor from In the Nightside Eclipse
 "The Gypsy", a song by the Irish Rovers from Emigrate! Emigrate!
 "Gypsy", a song by Luscious Jackson from Electric Honey
 "Gypsy", a song by Mercyful Fate from Don't Break the Oath
 "Gypsy", a song by Van Morrison from Saint Dominic's Preview
 "Gypsy", a song by Savoy Brown from Looking In
 "Gypsy", a song by Armin van Buuren from Shivers
 "Gypsy", a song by Suzanne Vega from Solitude Standing
 "Gypsy", a song from the musical Lord of the Dance

Other music
 Gypsy (musical), a 1959 stage musical about Gypsy Rose Lee
Cyganie (The Gypsies), an 1852 operetta by Stanisław Moniuszko
The Gypsies, an opera by Dmitri Shostakovich
 Gypsy, a figure in contra dance choreography

People
 Gypsy (calypsonian) (born 1953), Trinidad and Tobago politician and calypsonian
 Kishansinh Chavda or Gypsy (1904–1979), Gujarati author
 Paul Miller, better known as GypsyCrusader (born 1988), often referred to as "Gypsy", American political commentator, activist, and streamer
 Gypsy (actress), Thai actress Keerati Mahaplearkpong

Places
 Gypsy Cove, a small bay in the Falkland Islands
 Gypsy, Kentucky, an unincorporated community
 Gypsy, Louisiana, an unincorporated community
 Gypsy, Oklahoma, an unincorporated community
 Gypsy Peak, a mountain in the state of Washington
 Gypsy, West Virginia, a census-designated place

Television
 Gypsy (TV series), a Netflix series
 Gypsy (Pakistani TV series)
 Gypsy (Mystery Science Theater 3000), a character on Mystery Science Theater 3000
 "The Gypsies", a 1966 episode of The Andy Griffith Show
 "The Gypsy", a 1966 episode of Death Valley Days
 "The Gypsies", a 1973 episode of The Waltons
 "The Gypsy", a 1985 episode of Night Court

Transport
 Gypsy (catboat), a sailing boat
 Chotia Gypsy, an American aircraft designed in 1980
 Maruti Gypsy, an Indian SUV introduced in 1985
 USS Gypsy (SP-55), a motor boat acquired in 1917
 USS Gypsy (ARS(D)-1), a salvage lifting vessel commissioned in 1946
 TSS Carlotta (1893), a requisitioned depot ship of the Royal Navy, renamed Gypsy just prior to being sunk in 1941
Gypsy cab, a term used in some areas to describe an illegal taxi operation

Other uses
 Gypsy (stereotype), the perceived character of Romani people in art and literature
 Gypsy (term), a common word that is used to indicate Romani people, Tinkers and Travellers
 Bohemians Football Club or the Gypsies, a professional Irish association football club

People with the given name
 Gypsy Abbott (1896–1952), American silent film actress
 Gypsy Boots (1914–2004), American fitness pioneer
 Gypsy Joe (1933–2016), Puerto Rican professional wrestler
 Gypsy Rose Lee (1911–1970), American actress and entertainer

See also
 Gipsy (disambiguation)
 Gyp (disambiguation)
 Gypsey (disambiguation)
 Gypsy cop
 Gypsy moth (disambiguation)
 Gypsy Nash, in Home and Away
 Indian nomads (disambiguation)
 Itinerant (disambiguation)
 Itinerant groups in Europe
 Spanish Gypsy (disambiguation)
 USS Gypsy, a list of U.S. Navy ships